This is a list of star systems within 40-45 light years of Earth.

See also
 Lists of stars
 List of star systems within 35-40 light-years
 List of star systems within 45-50 light-years
 List of nearest stars and brown dwarfs

References

star systems within 40–45 light-years
Star systems
star systems within 40–45 light-years